Nauvoo is an unincorporated community in Tioga County, Pennsylvania, United States.

History 

Nauvoo was founded in 1844 by the Mormon Nauvoo on account of the Mormon elder D.W. Canfield, who resided there. During this time, Nauvoo consisted of two stores, a post-office, a saloon, a hotel, a church, a grist-mill, a saw-mill, a school-house, a blacksmith shop, a wagon shop, and 25 dwellings.

In 1840, Horace Fellows began manufacturing woolen goods and cloths. He eventually sold his machinery to Nauvoo.

The word Nauvoo is Hebrew and means beautiful, a place of rest and beauty.

Geography 
Nauvoo is on the line between the townships of Liberty and Morris.

Special Features 
There were four post-offices in the Nauvoo area in 1883.

Notable person
Kenneth B. Lee, Speaker of the Pennsylvania House of Representatives

Notes

Unincorporated communities in Tioga County, Pennsylvania
Unincorporated communities in Pennsylvania